Parematheudes polystictella is a species of snout moth in the genus Parematheudes. It was described by George Hampson in 1918 and is known from Malawi and South Africa.

References

Moths described in 1918
Phycitinae